Peppermill Reno is a hotel and casino located in Reno, Nevada owned and operated by Peppermill Casinos, Inc.

Background

Peppermill Reno opened as Peppermill Coffee Shop and Lounge. Today, it has expanded to include a Tuscan themed pool deck, 1,623 hotel rooms, 785 suites, 10 restaurants, and 107,272 sq. ft. of convention space. 

Restaurants include a 24-hour café; nightlife and entertainment options include 15 themed bars and lounges. 

Peppermill's Spa and Salon Toscana is a 33,000 square foot spa retreat with a caldarium including indoor pool, sun deck, and garden. 24 treatment rooms and a salon are available. The spa also includes a 9,500 square foot health club, two geothermally-heated, resort-style pools with private cabanas, and an outside bar.

The property has an overwhelmingly Tuscan theme, including the largest poker room in Reno with 19 tables and a VIP room, renovations to restaurants and a remodel of the casino floor. The privately held company consisting of five investors has also invested in the remodel of its Western Village in Sparks, Nevada also to a Tuscan motif.

History
Before Peppermill Reno grew into the resort, spa, and casino that it is today, the Peppermill Coffee Shop and Lounge was opened on April 23, 1971 by lifelong friends Nat Carasali and Bill Paganetti. The Peppermill expanded into gambling in 1979, and a small casino and motor lodge was opened in 1980. In 1986, the casino underwent a major expansion adding a convention center and hotel tower. 

Planning for an expansion project began in 1999, with construction eventually starting in 2005. The $400 million expansion included the 600-room Tuscany Tower, which opened in December 2007.

The Peppermill expanded to Las Vegas, Nevada on December 26, 1972 with the opening of Peppermill Restaurant and Fireside Lounge. To date, Peppermill Resort Spa Casino has not opened a hotel or resort in Las Vegas. Peppermill Resort Spa Casino further expanded by opening Western Village in Sparks, Nevada in 1983, the Rainbow Club in Henderson, Nevada, also in 1983, and a Peppermill Wendover in Wendover, Nevada in 1984.

Dining
The Peppermill Resort Spa Casino offers a variety of restaurant dining options from casual to fine dining.

Geothermal energy
In 2009, the Peppermill began a project to heat its property with geothermal energy. A geothermal well was drilled just north of its Tuscany Tower. A temperature of at least  is required to be efficient enough to replace four boilers which had previously supplied all of the property's heating. In addition to providing all of the domestic heating needs of the facility (with the exception of the laundry facility, as well as a few dishwashers which still require natural gas), the wells provide some of the cooling for the facility. Completion of the project was in early 2010. A reinjection well had already been constructed on the property just west of the marquee during a prior expansion. An additional reinjection well was also constructed to the south of the existing reinjection site, at the far southeastern corner of the resort's property (the most recent well is at the northwest corner of the property), allowing for the maximum possible distance between the extraction and reinjection sites. The Peppermill was planned to be the only hotel in the United States for which the heating is provided solely by geothermal energy derived on their immediate property. In October 2009, the Peppermill hosted the Geothermal Resources Council (GRC) and GEA Trade Show.

While the temperature of the well is not high enough to generate steam, an experiment was conducted which proved that electricity could be generated with the well. At , the well was only able to produce 270 KW of electricity, well below the 9 to 10 MW required to power a facility of its size.  A similar system is used several miles to the south at the Steamboat Springs. Using such a system, the Peppermill could generate 3 to 4 MW of power, to be used during peak energy periods.

References

External links
 
 

1971 establishments in Nevada
Casino hotels
Casinos completed in 1971
Casinos in Reno, Nevada
Hotel buildings completed in 1971
Hotel buildings completed in 1979
Hotel buildings completed in 2007
Hotels in Reno, Nevada
Resorts in Nevada